Aglossa tanya is a species of snout moth in the genus Aglossa. It was described by Alexander Steven Corbet and Willie Horace Thomas Tams in 1943 and is known to originate from India.

References

Moths described in 1943
Pyralini
Moths of Asia